Anette Nilsson-Granstedt (born 24 January 1968) is a Swedish orienteering competitor. She is Relay World Champion from 1993, as a member of the Swedish winning team. She also has a silver medal from 1995, and a bronze medal from 1999.

References

External links
 
 

1968 births
Living people
Swedish orienteers
Foot orienteers
Female orienteers
World Orienteering Championships medalists
Competitors at the 2001 World Games
World Games silver medalists
World Games bronze medalists